Sharon M. Lewis is a Canadian television personality and film director from Toronto, Ontario. She studied political science at the University of Toronto. She was an actress and author before being the host of counterSpin on CBC Television in 2001, and then hosted ZeD, also for the Canadian Broadcasting Corporation. She began her career on counterSpin with a special on the September 11 attacks. She called herself an "activist," saying "it's a journalist's job to activate change through information... Who isn't passionate and is in the journalist field, otherwise I don't know what would drive you?" After leaving ZeD, Ziya Tong took over as host. Lewis subsequently established the company urbansoul inc., which promotes the art of minority women.

During her acting career, she appeared on Degrassi: The Next Generation as the mother of Jimmy Brooks, who was played by rapper Drake. She also appeared in the film Troubled Waters.

In 2017, Lewis directed her Afro-futurist feature film Brown Girl Begins, a feature film prequel to the celebrated novel Brown Girl in the Ring by Nalo Hopkinson.

Lewis is a member of Film Fatales.

Filmography

Filmmaker

Actress

References

External links
Sharon Lewis' ZeD biography

Year of birth missing (living people)
Living people
20th-century Canadian actresses
21st-century Canadian actresses
Actresses from Toronto
Black Canadian actresses
Black Canadian broadcasters
Black Canadian filmmakers
Canadian film actresses
Canadian stage actresses
Canadian television actresses
Canadian television hosts
Canadian women television hosts
CBC Television people
Film directors from Toronto
Writers from Toronto
University of Toronto alumni
Canadian television directors
Canadian women television directors
Canadian women film directors
Canadian women screenwriters